The 1913 World Greco-Roman Wrestling Championship were held in Breslau, Germany in late July 1913.

Medal table

Medal summary

Men's Greco-Roman

References
FILA Database

World Wrestling Championships
W
1913
W